Castle Island is an island in far northern Greenland. Administratively it is part of the Northeast Greenland National Park.

Geography
Castle Island is located in Saint Andrew Bay, east of Hendrik Island, in the mouth area of Sherard Osborn Fjord.
The northernmost headland of the island is Cape Cleveland and the southernmost Cape Gray.

The island is unglaciated with two lakes between two mountain ridges. The peak in its eastern end reaches . The sea around the island is rarely free from ice.

See also
List of islands of Greenland

References

Uninhabited islands of Greenland